Amlarem is one of the 60 Legislative Assembly constituencies of Meghalaya, a north east state of India. It is part of West Jaintia Hills district and is reserved for candidates belonging to the Scheduled Tribes. It falls under Shillong Lok Sabha constituency and its MLA is Lahkmen Rymbui of United Democratic Party.

Members of the Legislative Assembly

Election results

2023

2018

See also
West Jaintia Hills district
Shillong (Lok Sabha constituency)
List of constituencies of the Meghalaya Legislative Assembly

References

Assembly constituencies of Meghalaya
West Jaintia Hills district